Bukit Kepong incident was an armed encounter in 1950 during the Malayan Emergency between the Federation of Malaya Police and the guerrillas of the Malayan National Liberation Army (MNLA), the armed wing of the Malayan Communist Party (MCP). This conflict took place in an area surrounding the Bukit Kepong police station in Bukit Kepong. The wooden station was located on the river banks of the Muar River, about 59 km from Muar town, Johor.

Chronology
The incident started just before dawn with the Communist gunmen launching a guerrilla assault on the police station leading to the deaths of almost all of the police officers stationed there. When they began the siege, the attackers strongly believed that they would be able to defeat the policemen and gain control of the police station within a short span of time. This was due to several factors in their favour: their arms and numerical superiority and the relative isolation of the station. The battle began at about 4:15 am.

According to eyewitness accounts, there were about 180 Communists attacking, led by Muhammad Indera, a Malay Communist. Despite the odds, the policemen led by Sgt. Jamil Mohd Shah, refused to surrender, although numerous calls by the communists for them to lay down arms were made. Several officers were killed as the shooting continued and two wives of the defending officers took up arms when they discovered that their husbands fell in battle.

In the final hours of the fierce battle, the Communists set fire to the officers' barracks and station. Two women and their children were burnt to death in the married quarters. At that point only 3 policemen plus a village guard were still alive. They rushed out from the burning station, unable to withstand the heat. They then assaulted the Communists position, killing at least 3 of them.

Only about five hours after the first shot was fired did the communists manage to break their defences and set the place ablaze. They then retreated into the jungle.

14 policemen, 2 civilians, 5 auxiliary policemen, wife of Abu Bakar Daud (one of the surviving policemen), wife of Abu Mohd Ali and two of their children's were killed in the incident.

Reinforcements from nearby villages 
During the attack, reinforcement were sent from Kampung Tui as the battle reverberated throughout several of the nearby villages. A band of villagers led by the village chief Ali Mustafa from Kampung Tui was escorted by 13 Auxiliary policemen. They were ambushed by the Communists en route about half a kilometre away from the station. The villagers were outgunned by the Communists who were using automatic weapons as opposed to rifles and shotguns held by the villagers. Several village guards were wounded and two more auxiliary police officers killed. Although stopped halfway, their presence relieved some pressure of the Bukit Kepong defenders and forced a general Communist retreat.

Due to the lopsided situation, Ali Mustafa ordered his guards to retreat while the rest were asked to defend the perimeter around Bukit Kepong town. The Communists eventually retreated after setting fire to the village office and robbing a few stores.

At the same time, another village guard group came from Kampung Durian Chondong using a sampan heading towards Bukit Kepong to render aid. They arrived there at 10am and that was when the first news of the attack on Bukit Kepong police station was communicated.

Aftermath 
When the village guards entered the village, they were able to observe the aftermath of the attack. The village chief took command of the outpost until relieved by a police team from Muar. The battle at Bukit Kepong is considered to be tragic defeat although it strengthened the Government and people's resolve to fight the Communist insurgency. A small force defending against overwhelming odds gave the war against Communist insurgency a massive boost in terms of morale. Some drew comparisons between the Bukit Kepong incident and the Alamo, where the Bukit Kepong policemen, similar to the Texans, came under overwhelming odds and fought to the last man.

List of killed in action (KIA)

Policeman
 Sergeant 3493 Jamil Bin Mohd Shah (Bukit Kepong police chief)
 Corporal 7068 Mohd Yassin Bin Haji Wahab
 Lance Corporal 7168 Jidin Bin Omar
 Police Constable (PC) 3933 Hamzah Bin Ahmad
 PC 5674 Abu Bin Mohd Ali
 PC 7493 Muhammad Bin Jaafar
 PC 7862 Abu Kadir Bin Jusoh
 PC 8600 Jaafar Bin Hassan
 PC 9136 Hassan Bin Osman
 Extra Police Constable (EPC) 3475 Mohd Tap Bin Lazim
 EPC 3795 Jaafar Bin Arshad
 Marine Constable (MPC) 60 Ibrahim Bin Adam
 MPC 68 Awang Bin Ali
 MPC 181 Basiron Bin Adam

Auxiliary Police (AP)
 AP 1925 Ali Akop Bin Othman
 AP 2127 Othman Bin Yahya
 AP 2130 Samad Bin Yatim

Auxiliary Police (AP) were killed in action (KIA) outside police station
 AP 1912 Mahmood Bin Saat
 AP 2098 Redzuan Bin Alias

Non-combatants
 Embong Lazim
 Koh Ah Cheng

Police family members
 Fatimah Binte Yaaba – wife of Marine Constable Abu Bakar Daud
 Hassan Bin Abu Bakar – son of Marine Constable Abu Bakar Daud
 Saadiah – wife of Constable Abu Mohd Ali
 Simah Binte Abu – daughter of Constable Abu Mohd Ali
 Arafah Binte Yusoff - wife of Marine Constable Ibrahim bin Adam

Malayan Communist Party 
40 guerilla fighters (names unknown)

List of survivors

Policemen 
 MPC 37 Abu Bakar Bin Daud
 PC 7645 Haji Yusoff Bin Rono (retired within rank of Sergeant, died on 14 April 2005)
 PC 10533 Othman Bin Yusoff
 EPC 3472 Ahmad Bin Khalid
Note: All officers are deceased

Police family members
 Mariam Binte Ibrahim – widow of Constable Muhamad Jaafar
 Zainun Binte Muhamad – daughter of Constable Muhamad Jaafar
 Abu Samah Bin Muhammad – son of Constable Muhamad Jaafar
 Zaleha Binte Muhamad – daughter of Constable Muhamad Jaafar
 Jamilah Binte Abu Bakar – daughter of Marine Constable Abu Bakar Daud
 Hussain Bin abu Bakar – son of Marine Constable Abu Bakar Daud
 Fatimah Binte Abdul Manan @ Timah Lawa – widow of Constable Hassan Osman
 Pon Binte Khalid – widow of Marine Constable Awang Ali
 Fatimah Binte Tuani – widow of Constable Hamzah Ahmad
 Edmund Ross Williams Hunt – Orang Asli mountain guide at Bukit Kepong

In popular culture

Film and novel

Bukit Kepong was a 1981 action film chronicling the events of the conflict; produced and directed by Jins Shamsuddin, who also portrays Sergeant Jamil Mohd Shah.

Bukit Kepong novel which was written by Ismail Johari and published by Dewan Bahasa dan Pustaka (DBP) in 1990. It was adopted as the Form 4 secondary school and Sijil Pelajaran Malaysia (SPM) educational teaching material.

Controversial statement on Bukit Kepong by PAS Deputy President 

On 21 August 2011, Mohamad Sabu, then Deputy President of Pan-Malaysian Islamic Party (PAS), now President of Parti Amanah Negara (AMANAH), made a controversial statement saying that Mat Indera, the leader of the communists during the Bukit Kepong Incident, was a national hero for fighting against British rule.

References

Notes
 Adapted from novel Bukit Kepong by Ismail Johari

External links 
 Pictures of Bukit Kepong by M Jeffri Razali

1950 in Malaya
February 1950 events in Asia
1950 in military history
British Malaya
History of Muar
Attacks on buildings and structures in Malaysia
Malaysian police officers killed in the line of duty
Wars involving pre-independence Malaysia
Communism in Malaysia
Civil wars in Malaysia
Malayan Emergency
Rebellions against the British Empire
Insurgencies in Asia
Massacres in Malaysia